Meyer Davis is an internationally recognized interior design boutique with offices in New York City, Los Angeles, Miami, and London. Founded in 1999 by friends Will Meyer and Gray Davis, the firm specializes equally in residential, hospitality, retail, and workplace design, and has over seventy full-time interior designers, project managers, industrial designers, and virtual designers on staff.

History 
Will Meyer and Gray Davis are natives of Nashville, Tennessee, and both attended Auburn University College of Architecture, Design, and Construction in Alabama prior to moving to New York City. Davis began his career in Montgomery, Alabama, at the office of his professor, Bobby McAlpine, and moved to New York City following college to work first for John Saladino, and later for Thomas O’Brien’s Aero Studios, where he designed for clients including Giorgio Armani and Ralph and Ricky Lauren. Upon moving to New York, Meyer trained with architects Peter Eisenman and his mentor Charles Gwathmey, working on homes for the likes of Steven Spielberg and Michael Dell.

Meyer and Davis were connected in New York by mutual friends and colleagues, and eventually began consulting with one another on freelance projects, leading them to formally establish Meyer Davis in their first SoHo office in 1999. Their collaborative studio began with a commission for a residence in Tennessee and a nightclub in Las Vegas, and quickly led to work for Oscar de la Renta (boutiques worldwide), Andrew Carmellini (Locanda Verde at the Greenwich Hotel), and John Varvatos (boutiques nationwide). Other notable clients of Meyer Davis have included Jonathan Tisch (Loews Hotels), Aby Rosen (Paramount Hotel), Barry Sternlicht (1 Hotels), the Frist Family (private offices and residence) and Jenna Lyons (private residence). The pair have also collaborated on numerous private residences in Upstate New York and East Hampton.

Along with designing for numerous private residential clients, Meyer Davis has collaborated with top chefs and restaurateurs like John McDonald and Chef Josh Capon, Chef Michael White and Altamarea Group, Chef Ford Fry, Chef Andrew Carmellini, Chef Michael Schwartz, Starr Restaurants, and SBE. Meyer Davis has been selected by a wide variety of top-tier brands worldwide to design hotels and residential developments; clients include Four Seasons, Rosewood Hotels, Auberge, Arlo, Loews, 1 Hotels, W Hotels, Le Méridien, The Ritz Carlton, and The Related Companies, as well as numerous boutique hotel and development groups. The studio has also designed retail and office environments for Oscar de la Renta, Dwell Studio, John Varvatos, Morgenthal Frederics, Snapchat, and The Assemblage.

Notable projects 
 W Rome; Rome, Italy 
 Grand Hyatt Kuwait; Kuwait City, Kuwait
 Etereo Auberge; Riviera Maya, Mexico
 Marcus at Baha Mar; Nassau, Bahamas
 Arlo Midtown; New York, New York
 Nearly Ninth; New York, New York
 Samos at the Ritz Carlton; Mexico City, Mexico
 Crown Hotel; Sydney, Australia
 One Barangaroo; Sydney, Australia
 Mr. C Residences; Miami, Florida
 The River House; Nashville, Tennessee
 Yerba Buena Island; San Francisco, California
 Rosewood Little Dix Bay; Virgin Gorda, British Virgin Islands
 Mauna Lani, Kamuela, Hawaii
 Carna Baha Mar; Nassau, Bahamas
 Four Seasons Arion; Athens, Greece
 Dream Printers Alley; Nashville, Tennessee
 Harrod's Social; London, England1 Hotel; Miami, Florida
 Oscar de la Renta; worldwide[15]
 St. Cecilia; Atlanta, Georgia[16]
 One Barangaroo; Sydney, Australia 
 Four Seasons; Papagayo, Costa Rica
 Park Grove; Miami, Florida
 Auberge Beach Residences and Spa; Fort Lauderdale, Florida
 Tennessee Farmhouse (private residence); Nashville, TennesseeFour Seasons; Houston, Texas
 Bowery Meat Company; New York, NY
 Casa Dragones Tasting Room; San Miguel de Allende, Mexico
 Paramount Hotel; New York, NY
 Proxi; Chicago, Illinois
 The Assemblage; New York, NY
 Boqueria; New York, NY
 Amagansett Beach House; Amagansett, NY

Made to Measure 

The Vendome Press published Meyer Davis’s first monograph in October, 2016: Made to Measure: Meyer Davis, Architecture and Interiors. Written by New York Times Style founding editor Dan Shaw, and with a foreword by writer and designer David Netto, the book illustrates the studio’s practice in both residential (private) and hospitality (public) design.

William Gray 

Meyer and Davis debuted their eponymous product company, William Gray, in 2020. The furniture, bath, and lighting collection personify the duo's urban sensibility, as well as their appreciation for timeless craftsmanship, collected sophistication, and travel. The collection reflects the studio's lauded aesthetic—carefully balanced style with comfort and luxury with accessibility. William Gray draws on over 20 years of design influence as leaders in the residential and hospitality design industries and creates an opportunity to explore new areas of design, from furniture and home accessories to experiential interiors. The William Gray collections include a wide range of sensual furnishings for dining and lounge produced by Stellar Works, two highly interpretive wallcovering lines for Calico wallpaper, a re-launch of two enterprising families of lighting with Rich Brilliant Willing, ambitiously developed bath collections for Claybrook, and a capsule collection of meticulously engineered light fixtures for Contardi. William gray Products are equally suited for residential and hospitality settings, fully customizable and available for distribution across the world. The Vessel Collection earned an Interior Design Best of Year Award in 2019, and the Hoist collection was a finalist in 2018.

Awards and honors 
Meyer Davis has received awards from Hospitality Design, Boutique Design, NYCxDESIGN (presented by Interior Design and ICFF), and the James Beard Foundation. Notable honors include being inducted into the Interior Design Hall of Fame in 2022, and in November 2018, Meyer Davis was one of four industry professionals inducted into Hospitality Design’s Platinum Circle hall of fame.

Notable awards include Interior Design’s Best of Year Award for One Park Grove, NYC x Design Award for Nearly Ninth, AHEAD Awards for Mauna Lani in 2020, a James Beard Award for restaurant design in 2017 for St Cecelia.

 Interior Design Hall of Fame Inductee 2022
 NYC x Design Award Dinner, Nearly Ninth, 2022
 LIV Award Winner for W Rome, Nearly Ninth, Etereo, Arlo Midtown, 2022
 Interior Design Best of Year Winner, One Park Grove, 2021
 AHEAD Award Winner, Mauna Lani, 2020 
 Boutique Design Gold Key Award Winner, Four Seasons Papagayo (2018)
 Interior Design Best of Year Winner, The Assemblage
 Hospitality Design Platinum Circle Award Honoree, 2018
 International Property Award Winner, Soho Loft, 2018
 James Beard Award Winner, St. Cecelia, 2017

References 

Interior design firms
James Beard Foundation Award winners
Design companies of the United States
Auburn University alumni